Virginia's 6th Senate district is one of 40 districts in the Senate of Virginia. It has been represented by Democrat Lynwood Lewis since his victory in a highly contested 2014 special election to succeed fellow Democrat Ralph Northam, who was elected Lieutenant Governor of Virginia.

Geography
District 6 is a disparate district which includes Accomack County and Northampton County on the Eastern Shore, Mathews County on the Middle Peninsula, and parts of the Hampton Roads cities of Norfolk and Virginia Beach.

The district overlaps with Virginia's 1st, 2nd, and 3rd congressional districts, and with the 79th, 83rd, 89th, 90th, 98th, and 100th districts of the Virginia House of Delegates. It borders the state of Maryland.

Recent election results

2019

2015

2014 special

2011

Federal and statewide results in District 6

Historical results
All election results below took place prior to 2011 redistricting, and thus were under different district lines.

2007

2003

1999

1995

District officeholders since 1940

References

Virginia Senate districts
Norfolk, Virginia
Accomack County, Virginia
Northampton County, Virginia
Mathews County, Virginia
Virginia Beach, Virginia